Davy Crockett and the River Pirates is a 1956 American Western film produced by Walt Disney Productions. A prequel to Davy Crockett: King of the Wild Frontier, it was thought as a mean to salvage revenue from the blunder of Disney killing off the Davy Crockett character too soon within the three program arc ending in the Alamo massacre, greatly diminishing the value that could’ve been derived from what surprisingly had exploded into a worldwide phenomenon. The feature film is an edited, repurposed  and recut compilation of the last two episodes of the Davy Crockett television miniseries. Episodes from the miniseries with footage from the film include: Davy Crockett's Keelboat Race and Davy Crockett and the River Pirates. The film stars Fess Parker as Davy Crockett and Buddy Ebsen as Crockett's amiable sidekick.

The film was shot in Cave-In-Rock, Illinois. The release takes place prior to the events of the previous movie, which consists of the first three episodes of the Davy Crockett miniseries.

Plot

Keelboat Race
Tennessee frontiersman Davy Crockett and his best friend Georgie Russell are transporting pelts to Maysville, Kentucky after a successful season of trapping and hunting. On the Ohio River, they encounter Mike Fink, the self-proclaimed "king of the river". Fink refuses to take Crockett and Russell downriver on his keelboat unless they pay his toll, which they cannot afford.

Fink challenges Crockett and Russell to a keelboat race to New Orleans, with the pelts and Fink's title as the stakes. Crockett uses his celebrity to organize his own keelboat crew for the race, which he wins despite numerous obstacles and Fink's cheating. Crockett allows Fink to keep his title, and Fink graciously gives him and Russell a ride downriver for free.

River Pirates
Fink drops Crockett and Russell off along the river, where they seek out Chickasaw traders to buy horses from. A Chickasaw hunting party captures them and takes them to their village, where they are preparing to go to war against white men for murdering Kaskaskia tribesmen. Crockett and Russell, having witnessed an earlier attack on Fink's keelboat but being told the Kaskaskia were driven out of the area prior, deduce that the attackers are in fact pirates masquerading as Native Americans. Crockett and Russell agree to bring the pirates to justice in exchange for peace and are released.

Fink agrees to help Crockett and Russell by posing as a banker hauling Spanish gold and stopping at various towns along the Ohio River to brag in order to draw the pirates out. The group attracts a traveling minstrel named Colonel Plug, whom Crockett agrees to take to the next town. Crockett correctly suspects Plug is in league with the pirates, led by Samuel Mason and the Harpe brothers, who are hiding at Cave-in-Rock. Plug notifies the pirates of the gold through song, but is subdued when he discovers the ruse. The pirates attack, but Fink's crew defends the boat successfully. Crockett and Russell pursue Mason and the Harpe brothers to their cave hideout, where they subdue the Harpe brothers. A keg of gunpowder explodes, sealing the cave and killing Mason. Having made peace, Crockett and Russell again part ways with Fink and head for home.

Cast 

 Fess Parker as Davy Crockett
 Buddy Ebsen as George "Georgie" Russell
 Jeff York as Mike Fink
 Kenneth Tobey as Jocko
 Clem Bevans as Captain Cobb
 Irvin Ashkenazy as Moose
 Mort Mills as Samuel Mason
 Paul Newlan as Big Harpe
 Frank Richards as Little Harpe
 Hank Worden as Fiddler
 Dick Crockett as Ben 
 Troy Melton as Hank 
 Douglass Dumbrille as Saloon owner (uncredited) 
 Walter Catlett as Colonel Plug  
 William Bakewell as Keelboat Race Master of Ceremonies (uncredited cameo)   
 William Fawcett as Old Timer with Livestock (uncredited) 
 George J. Lewis as Chief Black Eagle (uncredited)

Songs
 "The Ballad of Davy Crockett" – Lyrics by Tom, Music by George, sung by The Griffin Family 
 "King of the River" – Lyrics by Tom, Music by Bruns, sung by Jeff 
 "Yaller, Yaller Gold" – Lyrics by Blackburn, Music by Bruns, sung by Walter Wellington

Reception 
Common Sense Media has given it a 3 out of 5 stars.

External links

References 

1956 films
Cultural depictions of Davy Crockett
1950s English-language films
Walt Disney Pictures films
Films directed by Norman Foster
Films based on television series
Compilation films
American anthology films
Pirate films
American folklore films and television series
1956 Western (genre) films
Films scored by George Bruns
Films set in Illinois
Films shot in Illinois
Films edited from television programs
American Western (genre) films
1950s American films